Open Door is a 2019 Albanian drama road film written and directed by Florenc Papas. It was selected as the Albanian entry for the Best International Feature Film at the 93rd Academy Awards, but it was not nominated. The film debuted at the Sarajevo Film Festival on 19 August 2019, subsequently going on a festival tour that included Thessaloniki, Sofia, Luxembourg, Kolkata, Cartagena and a homecoming in Tirana.

Plot
Rudina, a married middle-aged mother, is overburdened with responsibilities. In addition to working as a seamstress in a local factory, she is taking care of her old in-laws, while her demanding husband works abroad and they only see each other once a year. She is also single-handedly raising their five year old son, Orion.

Rudina is expecting her sister Elma to come back from Italy, where she lives and works, so that they can go and visit their father in their home village, on the anniversary of their mother's death. But when Elma arrives on the ferry from Bari, Rudina is shocked to see that she is pregnant. It will certainly be a problem for the old head of the family to see his unmarried daughter with a child on the way.

The two sisters, along with Orion, get on the road and come up with the idea to enlist an old friend of Elma's to pretend to be her husband during their visit.

Cast
 Luli Bitri as Rudina
 Jonida Vokshi as Elma
 Sotiraq Bratko as Father
 Elidon Alikaj as Geni
 Maxwell Guzja as Orion
 Gulielm Radoja as Receptionist
 Visar Vishka as Rezart
 Jorgaq Tushe as Father-in-law
 Kastriot Shehi as Italian Boss
 Andi Begolli as Indrit
 Lutfi Hoxha as Passerby

See also
 List of submissions to the 93rd Academy Awards for Best International Feature Film
 List of Albanian submissions for the Academy Award for Best International Feature Film

References

External links
 

2019 films
2019 drama films
2019 multilingual films
2010s drama road movies
Albanian drama films
Albanian-language films
2010s Italian-language films